The Mount Isa Murders, also known as the Spear Creek Killings, took place  from the small North Queensland town of Mount Isa at Spear Creek. While there have been a number of other murders, the term "Mount Isa Murders" here refers to the Spear Creek Killings. This triple murder took place in October 1978 and remained unsolved until an arrest was made in April 2019.

History of the area 
The Mount Isa area has a history of murders and unsolved crimes. Historically, the Mount Isa area was a region of economic and social instability. In the 1930s, entrepreneurs seeking economic gain from mining and farming land in the area caused significant social change. The introduction of a class structure disrupted the social balance of the area. These social structures were a fundamental influence on the type of crimes that were committed. During the Depression and World War II, itinerant workers entered the Mount Isa area in large numbers, increasing crime rates significantly. Thefts and violent crime greatly increased. It was a time of social, political and economic pressure. There were tensions between social groups, mining and farming industries, and classes. This pressure is no longer so prevalent, but crime rates have remained high.

From 2012 to 2018, crime rates in North-West Queensland increased from 7,310 offences to 9,842. Violent crime rates in far North Queensland are more than double the Queensland average. In the Mount Isa area specifically, crime rates are quadruple the state average. This could be explained by the relatively low socioeconomic status and the high unemployment rates of the Mount Isa area.

The Spear Creek Killings 
Karen Edwards (23) and her partner, Tim Thomson (31), and his friend Gordon Twaddle (21) were on a motorcycle expedition through central Australia. Edwards was a trainee medical psychologist from Dandenong, whereas Thomson was a teacher and Twaddle a pastry cook. Both men were New Zealanders who had been in Australia for less than two years.

The trio were travelling from Alice Springs towards Cairns and then Melbourne. Edwards and Thomson rode on a red and gold 1977 BMW 100S with a homemade sidecar which carried their gear and 9-month-old Doberman. Twaddle rode a blue 1977 Suzuki GS750 with a racing cowling.

The distinctive group were last seen on October 5, 1978, in the Moondurra Caravan Park in Mount Isa. Witnesses had earlier seen the group accompanied by a third motorcyclist, and later by an unidentified bearded man in a 4WD (a brown-and-white Toyota Land Cruiser) on their last day.

Killings 
The body was discovered by a local resident, Stan Harris, while with his wife exercising their greyhounds. He found her body sprawled against a tree. The following morning, police found the bodies of Thomson and Twaddle, nearby and similarly positioned.

Police investigation 
The victims had been stripped of identification, and investigators initially thought they were hitchhikers. Four detectives were injured when a helicopter, hired to search the site, crash landed. One week after the discovery, Edwards’ father came forward after identifying his daughter’s watch in a newspaper report.

The 4WD man quickly became a suspect, with sightings of both him and his vehicle in several locations around the time of the murders. He was never found and his identity remains unknown.

The original investigation focused on linking the triple murder to other murders at the time. The murder of John Tzelaidis in July 1978 in Dampier, Western Australia was originally thought to be associated with the murders. Ivan Milat was later also a person of interest. There is little public information on the original investigation, and a suspect was never identified or charged.

In 2018, detectives from the Cold Case Investigation Team along with the Mount Isa Criminal Investigation Branch launched a review of the unsolved triple homicide. This included a review of the information provided by witnesses over the years. In March 2019, a new appeal was made by police, urging anyone with information regarding the murders to come forward. These appeals led to almost 50 leads in the span of a week. Police revealed that while some of these contained information they already had, there were some new leads.

Suspect 
On 12 April 2019, the Homicide Cold Case Investigation Team arrested a 63-year-old Goulburn man and former prison guard, Bruce John Preston, on three counts of murder. Preston was known to the victims, and he was originally interviewed by police in 1977 after they found him in possession of the BMW. Preston had the stolen motorcycle cleaned, the wheels changed, and parts removed. In 1978, he was convicted of theft of the vehicle and fined $300. He maintained that he had simply found the motorcycle.

Preston was also on a motorcycle trip across Australia at this time. Witnesses saw a man matching Preston's description with the victims the night prior to their murder. The friends were last seen entering a brown Toyota Land Cruiser. At the time, Preston's father owned a car similar to this description.

Detective Senior Sergeant Tara Kentwell stated that little was known regarding Preston's motives. Preston's lawyer appeared in court on behalf of the accused in April 2019, stating that his client denied being in Mount Isa at the time of the murders and would be appealing the charges. His claim contradicted by an earlier statement in an interview prior to his arrest when he stated that he was in Mount Isa when the three friends went missing. Preston remained in custody and was later permitted to apply for bail.

Despite this progress in the 2019 investigation, police continue to look for any further information regarding the killings, and are offering indemnity from prosecution for any accomplice who can provide insight. A reward of $250,000 is currently being offered.

Timeline 
 September 30, 1978: Edwards arrived in Alice Springs where she met up with Thomson and Twaddle before they rode North.
 October 2: The trio started their trip. They stopped at Aileron where they camped overnight.
 October 3: The friends made four stops at Wauchope, Devils Marbles, The Three Ways, and Frewena before they camped overnight in the Barry Caves. Between The Three Ways and Frewena, they met up with another male motorcyclist who travelled on with them to their campsite.
 October 4: It is believed this male continued to travel with the friends until they reached Moondarra Caravan Park, where the trio and their dog checked in for two nights. That evening, another unidentified man driving a brown and white Toyota Land Cruiser joined the friends at the campsite.
 October 5: The trio were last seen leaving the caravan park in the morning in the 4WD. Late that afternoon, the driver hastily packed up the camp and bikes and took Thomson's Doberman, Tristie.
 October 6: Tristie was found abandoned at the Mount Isa Dump. She was later euthanised before the victims were discovered.
October 16: Twaddle’s motorbike was found abandoned in Mt Isa.
 October 24: The body of Edwards is discovered.
October 25: The other bodies are found.
 October 30: The possessions of the victims were found dumped in some of the barrels bordering the Mount Isa Dump. This was next to where the dog was found.
November 13: Thomson’s motorcycle is located in a raid on Preston’s garage. A 4WD and rifles are also impounded.

Other murders

Frederick and Phillis Mabb 

In 2009, an 82-year-old man was found murdered in his Mount Isa home, and his wife (71) was found seriously injured. She sustained significant head injuries and was placed in an induced coma at Mount Isa Base Hospital. She later died in hospital. The suspect, Donald Tommy George, was convicted and sentenced to life in prison in 2012, with a mandatory non-parole period of 20 years.

Scott Maitland and Cindy Masonwells 

In July 2012, the Mount Isa couple were murdered by Cairns mechanic Peter MacGowen after a disagreement over restoration to their panel van. Maitland was shot in the back of the head, and Masonwells was stabbed. Their bodies were dumped near a dam in Copperload, Cairns. MacGowen was sentenced to 30 years' imprisonment, and his appeals were dismissed.

Kyle Coleman 

In February 2014, Kyle Coleman (17), from Mt. Isa, left on a camping trip with his friend James Coleman (no relation) (21). James returned home some days later, but earlier than expected, and without Kyle. A few days later, James took his own life. In a statement released by the coroner Stephanie Williams, there was no concrete evidence to suggest that James had intentions to harm Kyle, and the coroner proposed that it was likely he died of a shooting accident. Investigating officers, however, believed James' statements to be misleading and untruthful, with his subsequent suicide suggesting his guilt.

Michael McCabe 

A 25-year-old old North Queensland man, McCabe, was murdered in 2015. His badly battered body was found decomposing in a creek bed in a national park near Townsville. Three people stood on trial for their alleged involvement in McCabe’s murder: one charged with murder, another with unlawful assault occasioning bodily harm while in company, and the third charged with being an accessory after the fact to murder.

All three pleaded not guilty in front of the Townsville Supreme Court. The autopsy report documented fractures believed to be from blunt force trauma with blows to the skull potentially caused by a rock. On May 15, 2015, a 45-year-old Townsville man who underwent a separate trial was sentenced to life in prison after being found guilty for the murder. Witness statements suggested that the motive behind McCabe's murder might have been a $10,000 debt he owed to the Rebels Motorcycle Club.

Toyah Cordingley 

Cordingley, a 24-year-old Cairns woman, was found murdered on Wangetti Beach in Far North Queensland in October 2018. Detectives believe the woman was attacked on October 21, 2018, while walking her dog. Media outlets initially speculated that a suspect fled the country. After the Queensland government posted a record-setting state reward of A$1 million for information leading to an arrest, Indian man Rajwinder Singh was arrested after hiding out in India's Punjab region. Commissioner Katarina Carroll said it was "very early days" but that she was "very confident we have a strong case to put before the courts". Once he has been processed by the courts, the process of extradition will ensue.

References 

1978 murders in Australia
1970s in Queensland
Murder in Queensland
October 1978 crimes
October 1978 events in Australia